The Gentle Crackdown II (Traditional Chinese: 秀才愛上兵) is a TVB costume comedy series broadcast in January 2008.

The series is an indirect sequel to 2005's The Gentle Crackdown (秀才遇著兵). The main cast features Wayne Lai from the original series and new cast including Steven Ma, Yumiko Cheng, and Ha Yu. The dynasty this costume sequel is in the Ming Dynasty.

Synopsis
Having lost her father at an early age, farm security guard Chan Sai-Mui (Yumiko Cheng) grew to be an outspoken and determined woman who would do her utmost to protect her home village.  It is her sincerity that has won her respect from all villagers of the Leung Choi County.  Sometimes she would get too enthusiastic and impulsive that she could bring about a lot of misunderstandings.  Amusingly, she has mistaken the newly appointed agricultural magistrate Tse Wong-Sheung (literal meaning "Thank you, Emperor") (Steven Ma) for a thief and the two of them have been bitter enemies ever since.  To keep himself from any possible trouble, Sheung has been avoiding Mui intentionally.

For the benefit of his son's future, Sheung's father Tse Chong-Tin (Ha Yu) has not only invited the intelligent Tai Tsung-Man (Wayne Lai) to be Sheung's assistant, but also found him four special bodyguards playfully named Chuk (Congee), Fun (Rice Noodle), Mein (Wheat Noodle), and Fan (Rice). (The names are foods that are the main staple foods of China.)  Despite the best arrangements for Sheung, he still gets framed by the corrupted officials from Changsha and is in danger of facing the most torturing punishment.  Luckily, Mui and Man manage to save him in the nick of time with a jade bowl bestowed by the former emperor.  To everyone's surprise, the jade bowl turns out a fake, but with Man's wit and courage, Sheung is finally saved from danger.  Mui has been through a lot together with Sheung and is starting to fall in love with him.  Sheung, on the other hand, has no feelings for Mui and decides to turn to Man for tips as to how to break away from her.  Mysteriously, Sheung starts being pursued by a hitman soon afterwards.

Cast

Main cast

Supporting Cast

Viewership ratings

Awards and nominations

References

External links
TVB.com The Gentle Crackdown II - Official Website 

TVB dramas
2008 Hong Kong television series debuts
2008 Hong Kong television series endings